Rebecca "Becky" Wilczak (born August 5, 1980, in Berwyn, Illinois) is an American luger who competed in the late 1990s and early 2000s. She won the bronze medal in the mixed team event at the 2001 FIL World Luge Championships in Calgary, Alberta, Canada

Wilczak also finished fifth in the women's singles event at the 2002 Winter Olympics in Salt Lake City. Prior to those games, she was dealing with the need for a liver transplant for her father, Tom.

References

External links 
 
 
 

1980 births
Living people
American female lugers
People from Berwyn, Illinois
Lugers at the 2002 Winter Olympics
Olympic lugers of the United States
21st-century American women